The Lost Album may refer to:

 The Lost Album (Skyhooks album), 1999
 The Lost Album (Lewis Taylor album), 2005
 The Lost Album, a 2020 album by Drake Bell
 The Lost Album (The Smithereens album), 2022